Caldas is a comarca in the Galician Province of Pontevedra. It covers an area of 288.7 km2, and the overall population of this comarca was 35,176 at the 2011 Census; the latest official estimate (as at the start of 2018) was 34,067.

Municipalities
The comarca comprises the following seven municipalities:

References

Comarcas of the Province of Pontevedra